is a Japanese anime television series that ran from April 12-December 13, 1987 on Nippon Television in Japan and was produced by Tatsunoko Productions. After the production of the anime, Tatsunoko Production and Mitsuhisa Ishikawa, the producer of Zillion, established IG Tatsunoko (which later became Production I.G) to obstruct the dispersing of the excellent staffs of Tatsunoko branch which had done actual production. Therefore, Zillion is considered to be Production I.G's first work.

Five of the 31 episodes were dubbed into English and released on VHS in the United States by Streamline Pictures. This anime was featured in the music video for Michael and Janet Jackson's collaboration "Scream". Samples from the English dub of the anime were also featured in Del the Funky Homosapien's single "Cyberpunks".

In October 2018, Funimation has released the complete series and the OVA on a Blu-ray/DVD set with Japanese audio and English subtitles.

Plot
The story takes place on the planet Maris in the year 2387. Around this time, the  civilization, led by Empress Admis, started a genocide program to kill all humans in order to lay eggs and reproduce on the planet. Three mysterious guns dubbed the "Zillion Weapon System" appear and three teen soldiers (JJ, Champ, and Apple) are chosen to wield them as a task force called  (W.N.) (known as the White Knights in the English version), whose purpose is to fight back against the Nohzas.

Main characters
 J.J. (ＪＪ): the series' 16-year-old main protagonist and third member of the White Nuts. He is an avid fighter.
 Champ (チャンプ Chanpu): the 18-year-old primary leader of the White Nuts.
 Apple (アップル Appuru): the 17-year-old female member and navigator of the White Nuts.
 Amy Harrison (エイミ・ハリソン Eimi Harison): a primary assistant of Mr. Gord. She has a liking for J.J.
 Mr. Gord (Mr.ゴード Mr. Gōdo): the commissioner/commander of the White Nuts.
 Dave (デイブ Deibu): a mechanic and assistant pilot, later member of the White Nuts.
 Opa-Opa: White Nuts' companion robot and ally, and later member of the White Nuts.
 Bernstein (バーンスタイン): Commander in Chief of Maris.

Nohzas
 Admis (アドミス): empress of the Nohza Empire.
 Baron Ricks (バロン・リックス): the main antagonist of the story, leader of the invasion troops.
 Navarro (ナバロ): a big Nohza soldier, filled with micromissiles, specially created to fight against the White Nuts, one of the three Nohza Warriors (N.W.)
 Solar (ソラール): a flying Nohza woman, also specially built to fight the White Nuts, the second N.W., shaped somewhat like a wasp.
 Gurdock (ガードック): a soldier with stretchable arms, the third Nohza Warrior created to counter the White Nuts.

Equipment
Equipment of the White Nuts team:
 Zillion (ジリオン): a mysterious weapon, impossible to analyze and reproduce. It fires a load of a strange substance, appearing as a red light that engulfs the target and disintegrates it. It uses a small red crystal ("zillionium") for ammunition, unstable and also impossible to reproduce. One of the guns is destroyed in episode 10 and reconstructed afterwards by Dave, changing its initially "flat" design to a more ergonomic one. All pistols are then rebuilt, allowing the use of special accessories that change them into a sub machine-gun, used by Apple, or a precision sniper rifle, used by Champ.
 Ridingcepter (ライディングセプター): a motorcycle. It can carry a Sidecepter (サイドセプター), a Cargocepter (カーゴセプター) or a Cannoncepter (キャノンセプター).
 Tricharger (トライチャージャー): a tricycle that can change into a versatile mobile suit. It has three forms, buggy form (バギーフォーム), kneeled form (ニールドフォーム) and armoretter form (アーモレーターフォーム).
 Big Porter (ビッグポーター): a Vertical Take Off and Landing vehicle, prepared to carry one of three special crafts, named:
 Submarine Aqua-Carried (潜航艇アクアキャリッド), a yellow small submersible;
 Armoured Vehicle Land-Carried (装甲車ランドキャリッド), a red battle tank;
 Fighter Bomber Aero-Carried (戦闘爆撃機エアロキャリッド), a blue air-and-space fighter.

Adaptations
Two video games for the Sega Master System have been spawned with the story loosely based on the series, Zillion and Zillion II. An original video animation (OVA) movie titled Zillion: Burning Night has also been released after the success of the TV series.

Despite the cult success of the video games, the Zillion anime received only a very brief release in the early 1990s in the United States. The first five episodes of the TV series, as well as the Burning Night OVA were dubbed and released on VHS by Streamline Pictures.

In October 2018, Funimation has released the complete series and the OVA on a Blu-ray/DVD set with Japanese audio and English subtitles.

In 1993, Eternity Comics published a comic book adaptation, written by Tom Mason, drawn by Harrison Fong, and lettered by Tim Eldred.

Characters

List of episodes
 "My Name Is J.J." (US title: "They Call Me, J.J.") (Original Airdate: April 12, 1987): written by Tsunehisa Ito
 "Attack the Enemy of the High Skies" (US title: "Hang Fire") (Original Airdate: April 19, 1987): written by Tsunehisa Ito
 "0.1 Second Chance!" (US title: "Split—Second Chance") (Original Airdate: April 26, 1987): written by Haruya Yamazaki 
 "Trap of the Shapeless Ninja Squadron" (US title: "Target, The White Knights") (Original Airdate: May 3, 1987): written by Tsunehisa Ito
 "Apple Order Violation!?" (US title: "Judgement Call") (Original Airdate: May 10, 1987): written by Mami Watanabe
 "Take Off, Tricharger" (Original Airdate: May 17, 1987): written by Haruya Yamazaki
 "Struggle 'Til Death! J.J. vs. Ricks" (Original Airdate: May 24, 1987): written by Tsunehisa Ito
 "Strike the Oceanfloor Base!" (Original Airdate: May 31, 1987): written by Mami Watanabe
 "Stolen Zillion" (Original Airdate: June 7, 1987): written by Mami Watanabe
 "Flames! Ricks' Counterattack" (Original Airdate: June 14, 1987): written by Tsunehisa Ito
 "Birth of New Zillion!" (Original Airdate: June 21, 1987): written by Tsunehisa Ito
 "Attack! Triple Shoot" (Original Airdate: June 28, 1987): written by Haruya Yamazaki
 "Angry Shutter Chance" (Original Airdate: July 5, 1987): written by Mami Watanabe
 "Nightingale of the Battlefield" (Original Airdate: July 12, 1987): written by Tsunehisa Ito
 "Life Or Death!? Confrontation of Fate—Part. 1" (Original Airdate: July 19, 1987): written by Haruya Yamazaki
 "Life Or Death!? Confrontation of Fate—Part. 2" (Original Airdate: July 26, 1987): written by Haruya Yamazaki
 "Tears! Let's Search J.J." (Original Airdate: September 6, 1987): written by Mami Watanabe
 "The Beautiful Noza's Challenge" (Original Airdate: September 13, 1987): written by Tsunehisa Ito
 "Match! Let's Throw the Coin" (Original Airdate: September 20, 1987): written by Haruya Yamazaki
 "Kick with a Broken Heart" (Original Airdate: September 27, 1987): written by Mami Watanabe
 "Clash! The Sniper" (Original Airdate: October 4, 1987): written by Takao Koyama
 "Great Victory from a Lie!" (Original Airdate: October 11, 1987): written by Takashi Yamada
 "Terror! Demon's Bio Weapon" (Original Airdate: October 18, 1987): written by Tsunehisa Ito
 "Great Adventure! Warrior Opa-Opa" (Original Airdate: October 25, 1987): written by Mami Watanabe
 "Gentle Fugitive Apple" (Original Airdate: November 1, 1987): written by Takashi Yamada
 "Revenge Demon Ninja!" (Original Airdate: November 8, 1987): written by Haruya Yamazaki
 "Extraordinary Rebel Ricks" (Original Airdate: November 15, 1987): written by Mami Watanabe
 "Mystery!? Zillion Power" (Original Airdate: November 22, 1987): written by Mami Watanabe
 "Heroic! Ricks Dies!?" (Original Airdate: November 29, 1987): written by Tsunehisa Ito
 "Planet Maris on the Corner!" (Original Airdate: December 6, 1987): written by Tsunehisa Ito
 "Last Shoot for Victory" (Original Airdate: December 13, 1987): written by Tsunehisa Ito

Music
 Opening 
 "Pure Stone" by Risa Yuuki

 Closing 
 "Push!" by Risa Yuuki (eps. 1–20)
 "Rock Candy" by Risa Yuuki (eps. 21–31)

Sega's involvement

Two games were made based on the series, both by Sega for the Master System: Zillion, an action game similar in play style to Metroid and Impossible Mission and a sequel, Zillion II: The Tri Formation, which was a faster-paced game involving a powered armor mecha which transformed into a motorcycle.

A Zillion-based laser tag toy line also by Sega was also released in Japan and Brazil. The design of the gun, which was also featured in the series released in 1987, was reused from the Master System Light Phaser light gun which was released in 1986 in North America, Europe and Brazil.

Opa-opa, one of Sega's early mascot characters (debuting in the 1986 arcade game Fantasy Zone), was a frequent minor character on the show. His frequent involvement with the show led many to believe that Fantasy Zone was actually a spin-off series based on the character, but in reality Opa-Opa was around a year prior to the anime, and was a guest character from the start. The fact that he appears so frequently on the show is simply a testament to the character's popularity in Japan at the time.

Later in the series, Sega and Tatsunoko changed the design of the anime series' guns, simultaneous with a cosmetic change in the laser tag guns on which they were based.

OVA

It is also referred to as "Red Bullet Zillion: Burning Night" and "Zillion: Burning Night Special".

Plot
In the peaceful aftermath of the Nozsa wars, the charismatic heroes known as "White Nuts" have changed career paths to becoming music making rock stars. Their music career would soon be interrupted by a new threat of colonial settlers. Apple is kidnapped by the sadistic ODAMA Clan - a family of ruthless killers. Located in a heavily fortified mountain retreat, J.J. and company attempt a rescue mission with their laser weapon Zillion. But the former Knights only have a limited supply of Zillium for the Zillion guns. A mysterious stranger named Rick, a wondering bodyguard for the ODAMA Clan, turns out to be an old lover of Apple.

Characters

Mechanical designers 
 Studio "Ammonite" (Hiroshi Ogawa, Hiroshi Okura, and Takashi Ono)

References

External links
 Zillion Shrine
 
 The Domain of Krltplps
 

1987 anime television series debuts
1988 anime OVAs
Adventure anime and manga
Anime with original screenplays
Funimation
Nippon TV original programming
Production I.G
Science fiction anime and manga
Tatsunoko Production
Fantasy Zone (series)
Sega Games franchises
Works based on Sega video games